Beryozovsky is a town in Kemerovo Oblast, Russia, located between the Barzas and Shurap Rivers (Ob's basin),  north of Kemerovo, the administrative center of the oblast. Population:

History
The settlement of Beryozovsky serving a mine construction was established in 1949 and named after the Beryozovskaya mine it was planned to serve. On January 11, 1965, the settlement was merged with nearby settlements of Kurganovka and Oktyabrsky to form the town of Beryozovsky.

Administrative and municipal status
Within the framework of administrative divisions, it is, together with two rural localities, incorporated as Beryozovsky Town Under Oblast Jurisdiction—an administrative unit with the status equal to that of the districts. As a municipal division, Beryozovsky Town Under Oblast Jurisdiction is incorporated as Beryozovsky Urban Okrug.

Economy
Coal mining and enrichment are the main activities.

References

Notes

Sources

External links
 Official website of Beryozovsky
 Beryozovsky Business Directory

Cities and towns in Kemerovo Oblast